Mitchells & Butlers Brewery was formed when Henry Mitchell's old Crown Brewery (founded in Smethwick in 1866) merged with William Butler's Brewery (also founded in Smethwick in 1866) in 1898. Henry Mitchell had moved to the Cape Hill site in 1879 and this became the company's main brewing site. It had its own railway network, connected to the national railway system from 1907–1962, via the Harborne line.

Various acquisitions included Holder's Brewers, who owned Birmingham's Midland Brewery, in 1919. The company merged with Bass in 1961. With the brand under ownership of Coors Brewers, the brewery closed in 2002 with production switched to Burton upon Trent. The brewery was undergoing demolition in 2005. The site is now a housing estate, although the Mitchell & Butler war memorial, built in 1920, has been retained and restored.

Their most famous beer was Brew XI (using Roman numerals, and so pronounced Brew Eleven), advertised with the slogan "for the men of the Midlands". It is now brewed under licence for Coors by Brains of Cardiff.

A descendant company, which manages pubs, bars and restaurants throughout the United Kingdom, is still known as Mitchells & Butlers, and is based in Birmingham.

See also
List of breweries in Birmingham

References

1898 establishments in England
1961 disestablishments in England
Defunct breweries of the United Kingdom
Mitchells & Butlers
Food and drink companies disestablished in 1961
Food and drink companies established in 1898
1961 mergers and acquisitions
British companies disestablished in 1961
British companies established in 1898
Companies based in Smethwick